Aghanashini  is a small village situated on the southern banks of River Aghanashini in the state of Karnataka, India.,  The river Aghanashini originates at 'Shankara Honda' in the Sirsi city  . It is one of the virgin rivers of the world. The water from this river flows unobstructed through the western ghats range and then joins the Arabian Sea.

History

Rajamundroog
Rajamundroog was the name of a redoubt adjacent to Aghanashini. It was a small square fort built of brown stone. At one point it was besieged by Hyder Ali and subsequently was taken by the East India Company during the

See also
 Uttara Kannada
 Districts of Karnataka
 Mangalore

References

External links

 

Villages in Uttara Kannada district